Tyukovnoy is a rural locality (a khutor) in Krutovskoye Rural Settlement, Serafimovichsky District, Volgograd Oblast, Russia. The population was 158 as of 2010. There are 2 streets.

Geography 
Tyukovnoy is located 57 km west of Serafimovich (the district's administrative centre) by road. Yelansky is the nearest rural locality.

References 

Rural localities in Serafimovichsky District